James Cutbush (born 1788 in Pennsylvania; died at West Point, New York, on 15 December 1823) was an American chemist.

Biography
Concerning his early history, very little is known, except that he taught chemistry. He was appointed to the United States Army with the rank of assistant apothecary-general in 1814, served first in Philadelphia, was afterward attached to the northern division of the Army, and was chief medical officer of the U. S. Military Academy and the Army post at West Point from June 1820 until November 1821. On the reorganization of the Army, he became assistant surgeon and acting professor of chemistry and mineralogy at West Point, in which capacity he continued until his death. He was president of the Columbian Chemical Society in Philadelphia.

In 1814, Cutbush was elected as a member of the American Philosophical Society.

Works
He wrote several papers in the earlier volumes of Silliman's American Journal of Sciences,” and was the author of:
 Useful Cabinet (1808)
 Philosophy of Experimental Chemistry (1813)
 Treatise on Pyrotechnics (Philadelphia, 1825)

Family
His brother Edward Cutbush was a noted surgeon and professor of chemistry.

Notes

References

 

1788 births
1823 deaths
American chemists
People from West Point, New York
Scientists from New York (state)